The Bread Peddler (French:La porteuse de pain) is a 1923 French silent drama film directed by René Le Somptier and starring Suzanne Desprès, Gabriel Signoret and Geneviève Félix. It is based on Xavier de Montépin's novel of the same title.

Cast
 Suzanne Desprès as Jeanne Fortier  
 Gabriel Signoret as Ovide Soliveau  
 Geneviève Félix as Lucie Fortier 
 Germaine Rouer as Mary Hartman  
 Henri Baudin as Jacques Garraud  
 Jacques Guilhène as Lucien Labroue 
 René Koval as Cri-Cri  
 Ernest Maupain as L'abbé Laugier  
 Jacques Faure as Etienne Castel  
 Pierre Almette as Georges Darrier 
 Lucien Bataille 
 Sylviane de Castillo as La bonne du curé  
 Charles Dechamps 
 Louis Kerly as Tête de Buis  
 Peggy Vère

References

Bibliography
 Goble, Alan. The Complete Index to Literary Sources in Film. Walter de Gruyter, 1999.

External links
 

1923 films
1920s French-language films
French silent feature films
Films based on The Bread Peddler
French black-and-white films
French drama films
Silent drama films
1920s French films